DP is a free software package for physicists implementing ab initio linear-response TDDFT (time-dependent density functional theory) in frequency-reciprocal space and on a plane wave basis set. 
It allows to calculate both dielectric spectra, such as EELS (electron energy-loss spectroscopy), IXSS (inelastic X-ray scattering spectroscopy) and CIXS (coherent inelastic X-ray scattering spectroscopy), and also optical spectra, e.g. optical absorption, reflectivity, refraction index. 
The systems range from periodic/crystalline solids, to surfaces, clusters, molecules and atoms made of insulators, semiconductors and metal elements. It implements the RPA (random phase approximation), the TDLDA or ALDA (adiabatic local-density approximation) plus other non-local approximations, including or neglecting local-field effects. It is distributed under the scientific software open-source academic for free license.

See also 
 ABINIT
 EXC code
 YAMBO code
 PWscf
 Quantum chemistry computer programs

References

External links 
 DP code web site

Density functional theory software
Physics software
Computational chemistry software